Darrell Frederick Hill (born June 19, 1979) is a former American football wide receiver in the National Football League for the Tennessee Titans and the Kansas City Chiefs. He played college football at Northern Illinois University. He wore number 80. Hill possesses a 4.2 time in the 40-yard dash and a 44-inch vertical jump.

High school career
Hill attended Mount Carmel High School in Chicago. Where he played football, basketball, and track and field. In 1996 Hill was an All-State, All-Area, and All Catholic League wide receiver. He helped lead Mount Carmel High School to the 1996 IHSA State Championship.

College career
Hill attended Northern Illinois University. Known in his college and prep days as “The Thrill”, he was part of the 1997 NIU recruiting class, that has been credited for turning around the Northern Illinois football program. This class also produced NFL players, Ryan Diem, Justin McCareins, Jermaine Hampton, and Frisman Jackson. Hill is considered to be one of the best WR to play at Northern Illinois University. Known for his big play ability Hill was voted All-MAC, All-American, and team MVP his senior season. Hill ranked fourth nationally in major-college football with a 21.6 yards-per-catch average in 2001.

Professional career
Hill was selected in the seventh round (225th overall) of the 2002 NFL Draft by the Tennessee Titans,  where he played for three seasons. He signed as free agent with the Kansas City Chiefs on April 5, 2005. 
Hill was a standout Special Teams Player during his career. Often regarded as one of the fastest Players in the NFL, Hill dominated as a gunner on punt, and kickoff coverage. Former Detroit Lions defensive coordinator Gunther Cunningham has referred to Hill as the best gunner he has ever seen in the National Football League. Hill is one of the only players to ever demand a triple team from the opposing team on punt coverage.

References

External links
 http://www.nfl.com/player/darrellhill/2505192/profile
 http://www.cbssports.com/nfl/players/playerpage/302050/darrell-hill

1979 births
Living people
Players of American football from Chicago
American football wide receivers
Northern Illinois Huskies football players
Tennessee Titans players